Lille OSC won Division 1 season 1945/1946, the first professional football season since the end of World War II, of the French Association Football League with 45 points.

Participating teams

 Bordeaux
 AS Cannes
 Le Havre AC
 RC Lens
 Lille OSC
 Lyon OU
 Olympique de Marseille
 FC Metz
 RC Paris
 Red Star Olympique
 Stade de Reims
 Stade Rennais UC
 CO Roubaix-Tourcoing
 FC Rouen
 AS Saint-Étienne
 FC Sète
 FC Sochaux-Montbéliard
 RC Strasbourg

Final table

Club from Alsace-Loraine, annexed by Nazi Germany during WW2, could not be relegated.

Promoted from Division 2, who will play in Division 1 season 1946/1947
 FC Nancy: Champion of Division 2, north group
 SO Montpellier: Champion of Division 2, south group
 Stade Français FC: Runner-up Division 2, north group
 Toulouse FC: Runner-up Division 2, south group

Results

Top goalscorers

References
 Division 1 season 1945-1946 at pari-et-gagne.com

Ligue 1 seasons
French
1